Fernando Cruz may refer to:

Fernando Cruz (baseball) (born 1990), Puerto Rican baseball player
Fernando Cruz (cyclist) (born 1953), Colombian cyclist
Fernando Cruz (footballer) (born 1940), Portuguese footballer

See also
Fernando de la Cruz (born 1971), Dominican baseball player
Fernando Cruz Castro, Chief Justice of the Supreme Court of Costa Rica